Mateo Klimowicz (born 6 July 2000) is an Argentine-German professional footballer who plays as an attacking midfielder for Liga MX club Atlético San Luis, on loan from VfB Stuttgart. Born in Argentina, he represented the Germany national under-21 team.

Club career
Klimowicz trained with Borussia Dortmund's academy at a young age, while his father was playing in Germany. He later joined Instituto's ranks. He appeared professionally twice at the back end of the 2016–17 season in Primera B Nacional, participating in fixtures with Juventud Unida, aged sixteen, and Nueva Chicago as they secured sixth. Klimowicz's first senior goal arrived on 14 October 2017 during a 1–1 home draw with Aldosivi.

On 10 May 2019, VfB Stuttgart announced the signing of Klimowicz ahead of the 2019–20 season; with the midfielder signing a five-year contract. He made his bow as a late substitute in a 2. Bundesliga match with 1. FC Heidenheim on 4 August. They won promotion in his first season, with his Bundesliga debut subsequently arriving on 19 September 2020 against SC Freiburg. He then scored his first goal in German football on 26 September, netting in a 4–1 victory at the Opel Arena versus Mainz 05.

On 1 September 2022, Klimowicz signed with 2. Bundesliga club Arminia Bielefeld on a season long loan.

International career
Klimowicz is eligible to play for Argentina, Germany or with the obtainment of citizenship Poland at international level. He received call-ups to train with Argentina at the U15, U17 and U20 levels. 

On 15 March 2021, Klimowicz was called up for the 2021 UEFA European Under-21 Championship group stages by Germany; he holds a German passport due to his father's career in German football. He debuted with the German U21 team in a 3–0 win over the Hungary U21 on 25 March 2021.

Personal life
Mateo is the son of former professional footballer Diego Klimowicz, who played for the likes of German clubs VfL Wolfsburg, Borussia Dortmund and VfL Bochum during a span of nine consecutive years. His uncle Javier also played professional football. Klimowicz is of Polish descent via his great-grandfather.

Career statistics

Honours
Individual
 Bundesliga Rookie of the Month: October 2020

References

External links

2000 births
Living people
Footballers from Córdoba, Argentina
German footballers
Germany under-21 international footballers
Argentine footballers
Argentine emigrants to Germany
Naturalized citizens of Germany
German people of Argentine descent
Sportspeople of Argentine descent
German people of Polish descent
German people of Ukrainian descent
Argentine people of Polish descent
Argentine people of Ukrainian descent
Association football midfielders
Primera Nacional players
2. Bundesliga players
Bundesliga players
Instituto footballers
VfB Stuttgart players
German expatriate footballers
Argentine expatriate footballers
Expatriate footballers in Mexico
German expatriate sportspeople in Mexico
Argentine expatriate sportspeople in Mexico